A sports sedan (also known as sports saloon in British English) is a subjective term for a sedan car that is designed to have sporting performance or handling characteristics.

History 

The term was originally introduced in the 1930s and early examples include the Sports Saloon versions of the Rover 14 and Rover 16.

From the 1960s, the term sports sedan was increasingly applied by manufacturers to special versions of their vehicles that allowed them to enter production cars in motor races. These cars contained modifications not normally permitted by the regulations which therefore required cars to be homologated typically by selling them in minimum numbers to the public. Some of the earlier examples were the Alfa Romeo 1900, Renault R8 Gordini, Triumph Dolomite, and Lotus Cortina.

In the twentieth century, sports sedans used a manual transmission and rear-wheel drive. However as other transmission types and drivetrain layouts have become more widespread for sedans in general, these have also been used by sports sedans.

North American usage 

The term "sport sedan" was initially used in North America for luxury import sedans (i.e. BMW, Audi, and Mercedes-Benz). These cars gave higher priority to handling than the domestic luxury sedans (i.e. Cadillac and Lincoln), which were more focused on comfort. However, since the 2000s, the domestic brands have begun producing sports sedan models such as the Cadillac CTS and Lincoln LS.

Another term sometimes used is to describe sports sedans in the US is muscle car, but that normally relates to V8-powered two-door coupe American cars.

Examples 

 Alfa Romeo Giulia (952)
 Audi RS4
 Audi RS6
 Audi RS7
 Aston Martin Rapide
 Bentley Arnage
 Bentley Flying Spur
 BMW M3
 BMW M5
 Cadillac CTS-V
 Dodge Charger (LX/LD)
 Jaguar XJ
 Jaguar XF
 Kia Stinger 
 Lexus IS F
 Lexus GS F
 Porsche Panamera 
 Porsche Taycan
 Maserati Quattroporte
 Mercedes-Benz C63 AMG 
 Mercedes-Benz CLS63 AMG
 Mercedes-Benz E63 AMG 
 Mercedes-Benz S63 AMG
 MG ZS 180
 MG ZT 260
 Mitsubishi Lancer Evolution
 Vauxhall VXR8
 Vauxhall Lotus Carlton
 Subaru WRX

References

External links